Lozotaenia karchana is a species of moth of the family Tortricidae. It is found in Ethiopia, where it is only known from the Bale Mountains.

The wingspan is about 22 mm for males and 32 mm for females. The ground colour of the forewings is brownish yellow with brownish strigulation (fine streaks) and some rust scales. The hindwings are pale brownish, but mixed with cream at the apex.

Etymology
The species name refers to the Karcha Camp, the type locality, a camp in the Bale Mountains.

References

	

Archipini
Endemic fauna of Ethiopia
Lepidoptera of Ethiopia
Moths of Africa
Bale Mountains
Moths described in 2010